Petr Akopov is a Russian propagandist working for RIA Novosti, a Russian state-owned news agency. Akapov was the author of the pre-maturely published and then retracted article titled "The arrival/attack of Russia and the new world" ("Наступление России и нового мира"), which was written in advance anticipating the Russian victory in the 2022 invasion of Ukraine. In the ominous article, Akapov announced that "Ukraine has returned to Russia" and condemned "Anglo-Saxons who rule the West" for "attempting to steal Russian land", and asserted that Russian President Vladimir Putin's launch of the invasion resolved the "Ukrainian question" to establish a "new world order" with "Russia, Belarus and Ukraine. Before the news agency retracted the article, it was republished by another Russian state-owned news agency Sputnik and published by the Pakistani newspaper The Frontier Post in English.

Akopov is listed by the database Putin’s List as a Russian propagandist, accused of "public support for the Russian military aggression against Ukraine.

Petr Akopov is included in the report "1500 warmongers" compiled by the Free Russia Forum. The report contains the names of Russian propagandists and others who were publicly involved in supporting Putin's invasion of Ukraine.

References 

Russian propagandists
2022 in Ukraine
Living people
Year of birth missing (living people)